Spöck is a small river of Schleswig-Holstein, Germany. It flows into the Upper Eider near Brügge.

See also
List of rivers of Schleswig-Holstein

Rivers of Schleswig-Holstein
1Spock
Rivers of Germany